The Conference USA Men's Soccer All-Conference Team is an annual selection of the best overall players in Conference USA during the NCAA Division I men's soccer season. Selections are based on a vote by the head coaches and announced the day prior to the Conference Tournament. The teams are divided into First, Second, and Third All-Conference Teams

2014 

First-Team All-Conference USA
 GK: Callum Irving, Kentucky
 D: Biko Bradnock-Brennan, Charlotte
 D: Jordan Wilson, Kentucky
 D: Darion Copeland, UAB 
 MF: Brandt Bronico, Charlotte
 MF: Napo Matsoso, Kentucky
 MF: Ben McKendry, New Mexico 
 MF: Chris Wehan, New Mexico  
 F: Kyle Parker, Charlotte 
 F: Quentin Albrecht, FIU 
 F: Freddy Ruiz, UAB 

Second-Team All-Conference USA
 GK: Austin Pack, Charlotte 
 D: Mathew Gibbons, New Mexico  
 D: Nick Miele, New Mexico  
 D: Mahamoudou Kaba, South Carolina 
 D: Braeden Troyer, South Carolina 
 MF: Nate Foglesong, Old Dominion 
 MF: Alex Clay, UAB  
 F: Justin Laird, Kentucky 
 F: Daniel Jodah, Marshall 
 F: James Rogers, New Mexico  
 F: Mikkel Knudsen, South Carolina

Third-Team All-Conference USA 
 GK: Alex Tiesenhausen, Old Dominion  
 D: Marvin Hezel, FIU  
 D: Ian Svantesson, UAB  
 MF: Dominic Bonilla, Charlotte 
 MF: Daniel Gonzalez, FIU  
 MF: Kristoffer Tollefsen, Kentucky 
 MF: Nick Edginton, Marshall 
 MF: Ryan Condotta, Old Dominion  
 MF: Kurtis Turner, South Carolina 
 F: Monbo Bokar, Charlotte 
 F: Ryan Price, FAU 
 F: Niko Hansen, New Mexico  
 F: Jesse Miralrio, Old Dominion

2013 

First-Team All-Conference USA 
 GK: Callum Irving, Kentucky
 D: Kyle Venter, New Mexico 
 D: Jason Gaylord, Old Dominion 
 D: Mahamoudou Kaba, South Carolina
 MF: Aidan Kirkbride, Charlotte 
 MF: Michael Calderon, New Mexico  
 MF: Ben McKendry, New Mexico 
 MF: Omar Mata, Tulsa
 F: Giuseppe Gentile, Charlotte 
 F: Tim Hokinson, Old Dominion 
 F: Cristian Mata, Tulsa
 F: Freddy Ruiz, UAB 

Second-Team All-Conference USA 
 GK: Sean Stowe, Old Dominion 
 D: Thomas Allen, Charlotte
 D: Steven Perinovic, Kentucky 
 D: Mathew Gibbons, New Mexico  
 D: Braeden Troyer, South Carolina 
 MF: Gonzalo Frechilla, FIU 
 MF: Brad Doliner, Kentucky 
 MF: Akeil Barrett, Tulsa
 MF: Alex Clay, UAB 
 F: Quentin Albrecht, FIU  
 F: Diego Navarette, UAB 

Third-Team All-Conference USA 
 GK: Michael Lisch, New Mexico 
 GK: Raphael Ville, UAB 
 D: Travis Brent, Marshall 
 D: Bradley Bourgeois, Tulsa 
 D: Darion Copeland, UAB 
 MF: Zach Hunter, Marshall 
 MF: Michael Kafari, New Mexico  
 MF: Tony Rocha, Tulsa
 F: Kyle Parker, Charlotte 
 F: Ryan Price, FAU  
 F: James Rogers, New Mexico

2012 

First-Team All-Conference USA 
 GK: Daniel Withrow, Marshall 
 GK: Jaime Ibarra, SMU 
 D: Steven Perinovic, Kentucky 
 D: Mladen Lemez, UAB  
 D: Andrew Quintana, UCF 
 MF: Matt Lodge, Kentucky 
 MF: Liam Collins, Memphis 
 MF: Omar Mata, Tulsa 
 F: Mark Sherrod, Memphis 
 F: Cristian Mata, Tulsa 
 F: Deshorn Brown, UCF

Second-Team All-Conference USA 
 GK: Jack Van Arsdale, Kentucky 
 D: Damien Rosales, SMU  
 D: Aaron Simmons, SMU  
 D: Darion Copeland, UAB  
 D: Reed Matte, UAB  
 D: Ben Hunt, UCF 
 MF: Cameron Wilder, Kentucky 
 MF: T.J. Nelson, SMU  
 MF: Braeden Troyer, South Carolina 
 F: Quentin Albrecht, FIU  
 F: Tom Jackson, Marshall 
 F: Tyler Engel, SMU  
 F: Bradlee Baladez, South Carolina 
 F: Kofi Gyawu, UAB 

Third-Team All-Conference USA 
 GK: Mark Pais, Tulsa 
 D: Joseph Dawkins, FIU  
 D: Anthony Hobbs, FIU  
 D: Dylan Asher, Kentucky 
 D: Jordan Johnson, Memphis  
 D: Mike Mangotic, South Carolina 
 D: Tony Rocha, Tulsa 
 MF: Daniel Gonzalez, FIU  
 MF: Devin Perkins, Marshall 
 MF: Andrew Morales, SMU  
 MF: Fatai Alabi, UAB  
 MF: Chase Wickham, UAB  
 MF: Omar Vallejo, UCF 
 F: Tyler Riggs, Kentucky

2011 

First-Team All-Conference USA 
 GK: Daniel Withrow, Marshall 
 D: Anthony Hobbs, FIU  
 D: Diogo de Almeida, SMU  
 D: Andrew Quintana, UCF 
 MF: Liam Collins, Memphis   
 MF: Warren Creavalle, UCF  
 MF: Kevan George, UCF  
 F: Mark Sherrod, Memphis  
 F: Arthur Ivo, SMU  
 F: Bradlee Baladez, South Carolina 
 F: Babayele Sodade, UAB 

Second-Team All-Conference USA 
 GK: Carl Woszczynski, UAB  
 D: Dylan Asher, Kentucky 
 D: J.J. Greer, Memphis  
 D: Reed Matte, UAB  
 MF: Tom Jackson, Marshall 
 MF: Anthony Virgara, Marshall 
 MF: T.J. Nelson, SMU  
 MF: Stephen Morrissey, South Carolina 
 MF: Omar Mata, Tulsa 
 F: Juan Castillo, SMU  
 F: Corey Albertson, Tulsa

Third-Team All-Conference USA 
 GK: Conor Hurley, Memphis  
 D: Danny Cates, South Carolina 
 D: Blaine Gonsalves, Tulsa 
 D: Mladen Lemez, UAB  
 MF: Braeden Troyer, South Carolina 
 MF: Tony Rocha, Tulsa 
 MF: Nik Robson, UCF
 F: Quentin Albrecht, FIU  
 F: Matt Lodge, Kentucky 
 F: Tyler Riggs, Kentucky 
 F: McKauly Tulloch, UCF

2010 

First-Team All-Conference USA 
 GK: Daniel Withrow, Marshall 
 D: Will Traynor, South Carolina 
 D: Justin Chavez, Tulsa 
 D: Hunter Christiansen, Tulsa 
 D: Curtis Ushedo, UAB  
 D: Kevan George, UCF 
 MF: Arthur Ivo, SMU  
 MF: Ashley McInnes, Tulsa 
 MF: Warren Creavalle, UCF 
 F: Blake Brettschneider, South Carolina
 F: Nik Robson, UCF

Second-Team All-Conference USA 
 GK: Jimmy Maurer, South Carolina 
 D: Anthony Hobbs, FIU 
 D: Dylan Asher, Kentucky 
 D: Jordan Hilgefort, Marshall 
 D: Leone Cruz, SMU  
 D: Yaron Bacher, UCF 
 MF: Matt Lodge, Kentucky 
 MF: Kekoa Osorio, SMU  
 MF: Josue Soto, SMU  
 F: Juan Castillo, SMU  
 F: Babayele Sodade, UAB 

Third-Team All-Conference USA 
 GK: Tyler Beadle, Kentucky 
 GK: Carl Woszczynski, UAB  
 GK: Shawn Doyle, UCF 
 D: Nicholas Chase, FIU  
 D: Kendall Sutton, Marshall 
 D: Chris Taylor, Tulsa 
 MF: Sammy Boateng, Marshall 
 MF: Michal Mravec, UAB  
 F: Michael Muehseler, FIU  
 F: Tyler Riggs, Kentucky 
 F: Tom Jackson, Marshall 
 F: Bradlee Baladez, South Carolina 
 F: Austin Neil, Tulsa 
 F: Kofi Gyawu, UAB

2009 

First-Team All-Conference USA 
 GK: Carl Woszczynski, UAB  
 D: Barry Rice, Kentucky 
 D: Tyler Ruthven, South Carolina 
 D: Justin Chavez, Tulsa 
 MF: Jason Griffiths, Kentucky 
 MF: Dustin Dawes, Marshall 
 MF: Dane Saintus, SMU 
 MF: Ashley McInnes, Tulsa 
 F: Sam Arthur, South Carolina 
 F: Austin Neil, Tulsa 
 F: Two-Boys Gumede, UAB 

Second-Team All-Conference USA 
 GK: Dan Williams, Kentucky 
 GK: Daniel Withrow, Marshall 
 D: Rick Alleman, Memphis  
 D: Chris Taylor, Tulsa 
 D: Curtis Ushedo, UAB  
 MF: Payton Hickey, SMU 
 MF: Yaron Bacher, UCF 
 MF: Kevan George, UCF 
 F: Matt Lodge, Kentucky 
 F: Jose Parada, Tulsa 
 F: Babayele Sodade, UAB 

Third-Team All-Conference USA 
 GK: Jimmy Maurer, South Carolina 
 D: Anthony Hobbs, FIU  
 D: Brad Walker, Kentucky 
 D: Kendall Sutton, Marshall 
 D: Andreas Guenther, Memphis  
 D: Ian Kalis, SMU  
 MF: Matt Butler, Marshall 
 MF: Kekoa Osorio, SMU  
 MF: Hunter Christiansen, Tulsa 
 MF: Michal Mravec, UAB  
 F: Steven Cabas, FIU  
 F: Sebastian Frings, FIU  
 F: Blake Brettschneider, South Carolina 
 F: Nicholas Robson, UCF

2008 

First-Team All-Conference USA 
 GK: Tyrel Lacey, Tulsa 
 D: Barry Rice, Kentucky 
 D: Michael Coburn, Memphis  
 D: Chris Taylor, Tulsa 
 MF: Jason Griffiths, Kentucky 
 MF: Joe Salem, Tulsa 
 MF: Two-Boys Gumede, UAB  
 MF: Kevan George, UCF 
 F: Juan Guerra, FIU  
 F: Sam Arthur, South Carolina 
 F: Blake Brettschneider, South Carolina

Second-Team All-Conference USA 
 GK: Jimmy Maurer, South Carolina 
 D: Tyler Ruthven, South Carolina 
 D: Chris Clements, Tulsa 
 D: Ryan Roushandel, UCF 
 MF: Leone Cruz, SMU  
 MF: Jeff Harwell, SMU  
 MF: Kekoa Osorio, SMU  
 MF: Jeff Scanella, South Carolina 
 F: Paulo da Silva, SMU  
 F: Ashley McInnes, Tulsa 
 F: Austin Neil, Tulsa

Third-Team All-Conference USA 
 GK: Dan Williams, Kentucky 
 D: Philip Fisher, FIU  
 D: Mark Wiltse, South Carolina 
 D: Dean Sorrell, UAB  
 MF: Masumi Turnbull, Kentucky 
 MF: Jira Cooley, Marshall 
 MF: Trey Gergory, UAB  
 MF: Michal Mrevec, UAB  
 F: Sterling Flunder, Marshall 
 F: Parker Duncan, Memphis  
 F: Jose Parada, Tulsa

2007 

First-Team All-Conference USA 
 GK: Dominic Cervi, Tulsa 
 D: Barry Rice, Kentucky 
 D: Adrian Chevannes, SMU  
 D: Chris Clements, Tulsa 
 MF: Bruno Guarda, SMU  
 MF: Ben Shuleva, SMU  
 MF: Jeff Scanella, South Carolina 
 MF: Eric DeFreitas, Tulsa 
 F: Juan Guerra, FIU  
 F: Jose Parada, Tulsa 
 F: Dejan Jakovic, UAB 

Second-Team All-Conference USA 
 GK: Jimmy Maurer, South Carolina 
 D: Jeff Lenix, Marshall 
 D: Michael Coburn, Memphis  
 D: Ryan Mirsky, SMU  
 MF: Masumi Turnbull, Kentucky 
 MF: Sterling Flounder, Marshall 
 MF: Adam Montgomery, Memphis  
 MF: Trey Gregory, UAB  
 F: Jared Britcher, Memphis  
 F: Dane Saintus, SMU  
 F: Ryan Roushandel, UCF

Third-Team All-Conference USA 
 GK: Steve Sandbo, SMU  
 D: Raoul Voss, FIU  
 D: Tyler Ruthven, South Carolina 
 D: Mark Wiltse, South Carolina 
 MF: John Daniele, Marshall
 MF: Sean Goulding, Memphis  
 MF: Scott Corbin, SMU  
 MF: Jeff Harwell, SMU  
 F: Aaron Swanson, Kentucky 
 F: Eric Burkholder, Tulsa 
 F: Todd Goddard, Tulsa

2006 

First-Team All-Conference USA
 GK: Matt Wideman, SMU  
 D: Mynor Gonzalez, SMU  
 D: Jay Needham, SMU  
 D: Ryan Leeton, South Carolina 
 MF: Mike D’Agostino, Kentucky 
 MF: Bruno Guarda, SMU  
 MF: Chase Wileman, SMU  
 MF: Dejan Jakovic, UAB  
 F: Riley O’Neill, Kentucky 
 F: Mike Sambursky, South Carolina 
 F: Jerson Monteiro, UAB 

Second-Team All-Conference USA
 GK: Mike Gustavson, South Carolina 
 D: Nathan Marks, Kentucky 
 D: Jeff Lenix, Marshall 
 D: Makan Hislop, South Carolina 
 MF: Kevin Walsh, Memphis  
 MF: Ralph Pace, South Carolina 
 MF: Matt Thomas, Tulsa 
 MF: Two-Boys Gumede, UAB  
 F: David Hope, FIU  
 F: Adrian Chevannes, SMU  
 F: Jose Parada, Tulsa 
 F: Zak Boggs, UCF 

Third-Team All-Conference USA 
 GK: Dan Williams, Kentucky 
 D: Jamie Gilbert, Memphis  
 D: Ryan Mirsky, SMU  
 D: Chris Clements, Tulsa 
 MF: Dadi Kristjánsson, FIU  
 MF: Masumi Turnbull, Kentucky 
 MF: Ben Shuleva, SMU  
 MF: Jeff Scannella, South Carolina 
 F: Karim Boukhemis, Marshall 
 F: Ayo Akinsete, South Carolina 
 F: Eric Burkholder, Tulsa

2005 

First-Team All-Conference USA
 GK: Andy Gruenebaum, Kentucky 
 D: Thomas Senecal, Kentucky 
 D: Jay Needham, SMU  
 D: Greg Reece, South Carolina 
 MF: Lucas Scudeler, FIU  
 MF: Dayton O’Brien, Memphis  
 MF: David Chun, SMU  
 MF: Mike Sambursky, South Carolina 
 F: Duke Hashimoto, SMU  
 F: Josh Alcala, South Carolina 
 F: Kyle Brown, Tulsa

Second-Team All-Conference USA
 GK: Mike Gustavson, South Carolina 
 D: Brandon Stewart, Kentucky 
 D: Jeff Lenix, Marshall 
 D: Dejan Jakovic, UAB  
 MF: Karim Boukhemis, Marshall 
 MF: Kellan Zindel, SMU  
 MF: Matt Wiley, Tulsa 
 MF: Sandy Gbandi, UAB  
 F: Carron Williams, FIU  
 F: Andy Metcalf, Memphis  
 F: Jason McLaughlin, UAB 

Third-Team All-Conference USA 
 GK: A.J. Robles, UAB  
 D: Mynor Gonzalez, SMU  
 D: Ryan Leeton, South Carolina 
 D: Jamie Dabney, Tulsa 
 MF: Jared Rose, FIU  
 MF: Mike D’Agostino, Kentucky 
 MF: Bruno Guarda, SMU  
 MF: Ralph Pace, South Carolina 
 MF: Eric Burkholder, Tulsa 
 F: Maurice Hughes, UAB  
 F: Jerson Monteiro, UAB  
 F: Billy Judino, UCF

2004 

First-Team All-Conference USA 
 GK: Sebastian Vecchio, Memphis 
 D: Justin Dyer, Memphis 
 D: Sandi Gbandi, UAB  
 D: Kareem Smith, USF 
 MF: Floyd Franks, Charlotte 
 MF: Daniel Dobson, Memphis 
 MF: John DiRaimondo, Saint Louis 
 MF: Ryan Wileman, Saint Louis  
 MF: Leandro de Oliveira, UAB  
 F: Adam Ruud, Charlotte 
 F: Dayton O’Brien, Memphis 
 F: Will John, Saint Louis 

Second-Team All-Conference USA
 GK: Dane Brenner, USF 
 D: Matt Neeley, Louisville 
 D: Brett Branan, Saint Louis  
 D: Tim Ward, Saint Louis  
 MF: Jeff Hughes, Cincinnati 
 MF: John Liersemann, Cincinnati  
 MF: Keeron Benito, USF 
 MF: Simon Schoendorf, USF 
 F: Wiremu Patrick, Cincinnati  
 F: Chris Lee, Marquette 
 F: Andy Metcalf, Memphis

Third-Team All-Conference USA 
 GK: Mike Vessels, Cincinnati  
 D: John Nabers, Charlotte 
 D: Ewen Blair, Cincinnati  
 D: Gary Connolly, Memphis 
 D: Joe Klosterman, UAB  
 MF: John Kornfeld, DePaul 
 MF: Bryan Dahlquist, Marquette 
 MF: John Reilly, Memphis 
 MF: Rogerio Oliveira, UAB  
 F: Terron Amos, East Carolina 
 F: David Guzman, Louisville 
 F: Rodrigo Hidalgo, USF 
 F: Hunter West, USF

2003 

First-Team All-Conference USA 
 GK: Brad Sokolowski, Louisville  
 D: Adrian Cann, Louisville  
 D: Nick Gannon, Saint Louis  
 D: Tony McManus, UAB  
 MF: Tim Brown, Cincinnati 
 MF: Josh Gardner, Cincinnati 
 MF: Leandro de Oliveira, UAB  
 MF: Marin Pusek, UAB  
 F: Simon Bird, Louisville  
 F: Chris Lee, Marquette  
 F: Vedad Ibišević, Saint Louis 

Second-Team All-Conference USA
 GK: Martin Hutton, Saint Louis  
 D: Anders Cedergren, Cincinnati 
 D: Brandon Dobbs, Cincinnati 
 D: Andy Pusateri, Saint Louis  
 MF: Floyd Franks, Charlotte 
 MF: Dayton O’Brien, Memphis 
 MF: John DiRaimondo, Saint Louis  
 MF: Brian Grazier, Saint Louis  
 F: Mira Mupier, Charlotte 
 F: Andy Metcalf, Memphis  
 F: Will John, Saint Louis 

Third-Team All-Conference USA 
 GK: John Adams, Cincinnati 
 D: Joe Lampert, Charlotte 
 D: Matt Neely, Louisville  
 D: Graham Gibbs, Memphis  
 MF: Clyde Simms, East Carolina  
 MF: Cooper McKee, Saint Louis  
 MF: Nnamdi Ngwe, UAB  
 MF: Keeron Benito, USF 
 F: Derek Guiterrez, Marquette  
 F: Jerson Monteiro, UAB  
 F: Hunter West, USF

2002 

First-Team All-Conference USA 
 GK: Clint Baumstark, UAB  
 D: Adrian Cann, Louisville  
 D: Steve Lawrence, Marquette  
 D: Nick Gannon, Saint Louis  
 MF: Joe Hammes, Saint Louis  
 MF: Jack Jewsbury, Saint Louis  
 MF: Marin Pusek, UAB  
 MF: Jeff Thwaites, USF 
 F: Jason Cole, Saint Louis  
 F: Flavio Monteiro, UAB  
 F: Hunter West, USF

Second-Team All-Conference USA
 GK: Troy Perkins, USF 
 D: Chris Schmidt, Memphis 
 D: Kevin Wickart, Saint Louis  
 D: Jared Vock, USF 
 MF: Tim Brown, Cincinnati 
 MF: Josh Gardner, Cincinnati 
 MF: Mike Robards, Marquette  
 MF: Nick Walls, Saint Louis  
 F: Mira Mupier, Charlotte 
 F: Simon Bird, Louisville  
 F: Derek Gutierrez, Marquette 

Third-Team All-Conference USA 
 GK: Martin Hutton, Saint Louis  
 D: Brandon Dobbs, Cincinnati 
 D: Tom Nolan, Marquette  
 D: Tony McManus, UAB  
 MF: Shane Carew, Charlotte 
 MF: Clyde Simms, East Carolina  
 MF: Fernando Tolomelli, Louisville  
 MF: Mike Kirchhoff, Saint Louis  
 F: Wiremu Patrick, Cincinnati 
 F: Luke Rojo, DePaul  
 F: Eric Marshall, Marquette

2001 

First-Team All-Conference USA 
 GK: John Politis, Saint Louis  
 D: Adrian Cann, Louisville  
 D: Jason Cole, Saint Louis  
 D: Marty Tappel, Saint Louis  
 MF: Sean Reti, Marquette  
 MF: Brad Davis, Saint Louis  
 MF: Mike Hill, Saint Louis  
 MF: Jeff Thwaites, USF 
 F: Sean Fraser, Memphis  
 F: Dipsy Selolwane, Saint Louis  
 F: Jason Cudjoe, USF

Second-Team All-Conference USA
 GK: Lucas Mackanos, Charlotte 
 D: Steve Lawrence, Marquette  
 D: Brantley Spillman, UAB  
 D: Jared Vock, USF 
 MF: Justin Stralka, Memphis  
 MF: David Beck, Saint Louis  
 MF: Nelson Mata, UAB  
 MF: Marin Pusek, UAB  
 F: Jack Jewsbury, Saint Louis  
 F: Flavio Monteiro, UAB  
 F: Martin Rey, UAB 

Third-Team All-Conference USA 
 GK: Clint Baumstark, UAB  
 GK: Troy Perkins, USF 
 D: Shane Carew, Charlotte 
 D: Stephen Lewis, Memphis  
 D: Bubba Garcia, UAB  
 MF: Bryan Godfrey, Marquette  
 MF: Mike Kirchoff, Saint Louis  
 MF: Nick Baker, TCU 
 MF: Gabriel Salgado, USF 
 F: Juan Munoz-Airey, Charlotte 
 F: Simon Bird, Louisville  
 F: Lars Thorstensen, Memphis

2000 

First-Team All-Conference USA 
 GK: David Clemente, UAB  
 D: Adrian Cann, Louisville  
 D: Joe Hammes, Saint Louis  
 D: Rumbani Munthali, UAB  
 MF: Ryan Schreck, Cincinnati 
 MF: Shawn Faria, Louisville  
 MF: Sean Reti, Marquette  
 MF: Brad Davis, Saint Louis  
 F: Myron Vaughn, Cincinnati 
 F: Sean Fraser, Memphis  
 F: Jack Jewsbury, Saint Louis 

Second-Team All-Conference USA
 GK: John Politis, Saint Louis  
 D: Jamal Frazier, Cincinnati 
 D: Stephen Lewis, Memphis  
 D: Jason Cole, Saint Louis  
 MF: David McGill, Charlotte 
 MF: Stuart Langrish, Louisville  
 MF: Justin Stralka, Memphis  
 MF: Mike Hill, Saint Louis  
 F: C.J. Robinson, Charlotte 
 F: Marshall Morehead, Marquette  
 F: Greg Krauss, USF

Third-Team All-Conference USA 
 GK: Jeremy Morales, Louisville  
 D: Sean Carew, Charlotte 
 D: Ntando Tsambo, Charlotte 
 D: Steve Lawrence, Marquette  
 MF: David Pedreschi, Charlotte 
 MF: Andy Hunter, Marquette  
 MF: Marty Tappel, Saint Louis  
 MF: Roberto Najarro, UAB  
 MF: Houston Smith, UAB  
 F: Juan Munoz-Airey, Charlotte 
 F: Shane Hudson, DePaul 
 F: Lars Thorstensen, Memphis

1999 

First-Team All-Conference USA 
 GK: Paul Nagy, Saint Louis 
 D: Andrew Kean, Cincinnati
 D: Rumbani Munthali, UAB 
 D: Brian Alvero, USF
 MF: Ryan Schreck, Cincinnati
 MF: Sean Reti, Marquette 
 MF: Jeff DiMaria, Saint Louis 
 MF: Jason Mims, Saint Louis 
 F: Marshall Morehead, Marquette 
 F: Peter Byaruhanga, UAB 
 F: Kevin Alvero, USF

Second-Team All-Conference USA
 GK: David Clemente, UAB 
 D: C.J. Robinson, Charlotte
 D: Jason Cole, Saint Louis 
 D: David Williams, Saint Louis 
 MF: Jamath Shoffner, Charlotte
 MF: Shawn Faria, Louisville 
 MF: Andy Hunter, Marquette 
 MF: Matt Cavenaugh, USF
 F: George Zabaneh, Louisville 
 F: Sean Fraser, Memphis 
 F: Flavio Monteiro, UAB 

Third-Team All-Conference USA
 GK: Jake Witkowski, Cincinnati
 D: Stuart Langrish, Louisville 
 D: Chad Garofola, Marquette 
 D: Steve Lawrence, Marquette 
 MF: Johan Cedergren, Cincinnati
 MF: Joe Ahearn, DePaul 
 MF: Joe Hammes, Saint Louis 
 MF: Brian Waltrip, USF
 F: Stephen Miller, Charlotte
 F: Chris Greer, DePaul 
 F: Vedad Alagic, Saint Louis

1998 

First-Team All-Conference USA
 GK: Jim Welch, Marquette 
 D: C.J. Robinson, Charlotte
 D: Kevin Kalish, Saint Louis 
 D: Ken Costello, USF
 MF: Christian Lund, Charlotte
 MF: Jeff DiMaria, Saint Louis 
 MF: Brian Alvero, USF
 MF: Jeff Houser, USF
 F: Jon Mabee, Charlotte
 F: Kevin Alvero, USF
 F: Brian Waltrip, USF

Second-Team All-Conference USA
 GK: Jake Witkowski, Cincinnati
 D: Andrew Kean, Cincinnati
 D: Brad Ruzzo, Cincinnati
 D: Wes Elias, USF
 MF: Pablo Pinzon, Charlotte
 MF: Jason Mims, Saint Louis 
 MF: Mike Moriarty, Saint Louis 
 MF: Rumbani Munthali, UAB 
 F: David Hughes, Charlotte
 F: Brian Benton, Saint Louis 
 F: Peter Byaruhanga, UAB 

Third-Team All-Conference USA
 GK: Skip Miller, USF
 D: Jeremiah Bass, Marquette 
 D: Chris Howle, UAB 
 D: Thor-Arne Loveland, USF
 MF: Jamath Shoffner, Charlotte
 MF: Shawn Faria, Louisville 
 MF: Stuart Langrish, Louisville 
 MF: Matt Briggs, Memphis 
 F: Myron Vaughn, Cincinnati
 F: Steven Brooks, Memphis 
 F: Erik Kuster, UAB

1997 

First-Team All-Conference USA
 GK: Jim Welch, Marquette 
 D: Ben Parry, Charlotte
 D: Max Stoka, Marquette 
 D: Kevin Kalish, Saint Louis 
 MF: Matthys Barker, Charlotte
 MF: Kevin Quigley, Saint Louis 
 MF: Joe Mattacchione, UAB 
 MF: Brian Waltrip, USF
 F: David Hughes, Charlotte
 F: Rogerio Lima, Memphis 
 F: Jeff Cunningham, USF

Second-Team All-Conference USA
 GK: Casey Klipfel, Saint Louis 
 D: Jim Kunevicius, Charlotte
 D: Mike Moriarty, Saint Louis 
 D: Rumbani Munthali, UAB 
 MF: Christian Lund, Charlotte
 MF: Donny Mark, Marquette 
 MF: Brian Corcoran, UAB 
 MF: Darick Metrius, USF
 F: Drew Watzka, Marquette 
 F: Emmanuel Eloundou, UAB 
 F: Jeff Houser, USF

Third-Team All-Conference USA
 GK: Mike Mobley, Cincinnati
 D: Jeremiah Bass, Marquette 
 D: Ken Costello, Saint Louis 
 D: Tim Tedoni, Saint Louis 
 MF: Shawn Faria, Louisville
 MF: Stuart Langrish, Louisville
 MF: Ramon Aguillon, Memphis 
 MF: Tony Carpenter, USF
 F: Brian Benton, Saint Louis 
 F: Joe DiNardo, UAB 
 F: Erik Kuster, UAB

1996 

First-Team All-Conference USA
 GK: Jon Busch, Charlotte
 D: Joe Mattacchione, UAB 
 MF: Matthys Barker, Charlotte
 MF: Fergal Forde, Memphis 
 F: Drew Watzka, Marquette 
 F: Rogerio Lima, Memphis 
 F: Mark Filla, Saint Louis
 F: Emmanuel Eloundou, UAB 
 F: Jeff Cunningham, USF
 F: Todd Denault, USF

Second-Team All-Conference USA
 D: Jim Kunevicius, Charlotte
 D: Scott Ziemba, Marquette 
 MF: Christian Lund, Charlotte
 MF: Tim Hamm, Cincinnati
 MF: Antonio Azcona, Louisville 
 MF: Billy Solberg, Marquette 
 MF: Kevin Quigley, Saint Louis
 MF/F: Tim Leonard, Saint Louis
 F: Kevin Berry, Marquette 
 F: Erik Kuster, UAB 
 F: Thomas Holmen, USF

Third-Team All-Conference USA
 GK: Mike Mobley, Cincinnati
 GK: Loukas Papaconstantinou, UAB 
 D: Kevin Bateman, DePaul 
 D: Ken Costello, Saint Louis
 D: Mike Moriarty, Saint Louis
 D: Esa Tabi, UAB 
 D: Danny Ziannis, UAB 
 MF/D: Michael Kim, Louisville 
 MF: Matt Bradner, Charlotte
 F: Stephen Pugliese, Charlotte
 F: Dan Stokes, DePaul

1995 

First-Team All-Conference USA
 GK: Jon Busch, Charlotte
 GK: Loukas Papaconstantinou, UAB 
 D: Mike Franks, Charlotte
 MF: Billy Solberg, Marquette 
 MF: Eric Cherveny, Saint Louis 
 MF: Matt McKeon, Saint Louis 
 F: Mac Cozier, Charlotte
 F: Cedric Thompson, DePaul
 F: Jacob Thomas, Saint Louis 
 F: William Guimmarra, UAB 
 F: Jeff Cunningham, USF

Second-Team All-Conference USA
 D: Joe Mattacchione, UAB 
 D: Danny Ziannis, UAB 
 MF: Billy Hamilton, Cincinnati
 MF: Antonio Azcona, Louisville 
 MF: Fergal Forde, Memphis 
 MF: Kevin Quigley, Saint Louis 
 MF: Brian Corcoran, UAB 
 MF: Mike Mekelburg, USF
 MF/F: Cory Butler, Marquette 
 F: Bernard Licari, Memphis 
 F: Mats Hagedorn, UAB 

Honorable Mention All-Conference USA
 GK: Jim Welch, Marquette 
 D: Grady Farmer, Charlotte
 D: James LaBar, Cincinnati
 D: Scott Ziemba, Marquette 
 D: Mike Moriarty, Saint Louis 
 D: Pat Moriarty, Saint Louis 
 D: Todd Denault, USF
 D: Trip Ellis, USF
 MF/D: Michael Kim, Louisville 
 MF: Patric Gross, Marquette 
 F: Thomas Holmen, USF

References

External links
 

College soccer trophies and awards in the United States
Conference USA men's soccer